Claeys is a Dutch/Flemish surname, derived from the given name Nicholas. Bearers of the name include:

People
Alain Claeys (born 1948), French politician
Alice Sue Claeys (born 1975), American-Belgian figure skater
Arno Claeys (born 1994), Belgian footballer
Dimitri Claeys (born 1987), Belgian cyclist
Geoffrey Claeys (born 1974), Belgian football player
Gregory Claeys (born 1953), British historian
J. R. Claeys, American politician from Kansas
Kevin Claeys (born 1988), Belgian cyclist
Philip Claeys (born 1965), Belgian politician and Member of the European Parliament for Flanders
Rob Claeys (born 1987), Belgian footballer
Roger Claeys (born 1924), Belgian football player
Tracy Claeys (born 1968), American football coach

See also
Claeys (company), Belgian combine manufacturer
Claeys Formula, formula used in Belgium to evaluate the notice period when an employee is dismissed

References

Surnames of Belgian origin
Dutch-language surnames
Patronymic surnames